The American Shakespeare Theatre was a  theater company based in Stratford, Connecticut, United States.  It was formed in the early 1950s by Lawrence Langner, Lincoln Kirstein, John Percy Burrell, and philanthropist Joseph Verner Reed. The American Shakespeare Festival Theatre was constructed and the program opened on July 12, 1955, with Julius Caesar. The theater building burned to the ground on January 13, 2019.

History 

Plays were produced at the Festival Theatre in Stratford from 1955 until the company ceased operations in the mid-1980s. The company focused on American interpretations of William Shakespeare's plays, but occasionally produced plays by other playwrights.  Other playwrights included: T.S. Eliot, Bernard Shaw, Sophocles, Giuseppe Verdi, Thornton Wilder, and William Wycherley.

When founded in 1955, the first artistic director was Denis Carey, who had managed The Old Vic. Under Carey's reign, the results were neither impressive financially nor artistically. John Houseman took over as artistic director in 1956, and his associate director was Jack Landau (director). Houseman resigned his position in August 1959 and Landau was promoted one month later.

The Hartford Courant has posted a poorly-organized but nearly complete history of productions at the theater.

It was the home of the American Shakespeare Festival.

The last full season of the festival as a producing organization was 1982. The last production on the theater stage was a one-person show of The Tempest in September 1989. Previous efforts had included plans to raise money to renovate the structure as well as alternate plans to demolish it and construct an amphitheater and black box theater in its place.

Notable actors 

Notable actors involved with the American Shakespeare Theatre included:

 René Auberjonois
 Meredith Baxter
 Dirk Benedict
 David Birney
 Morris Carnovsky

 Alex Cord
 David Groh
 Katharine Hepburn
 Earle Hyman
 Will Geer

 Fred Gwynne
 Margaret Hamilton
 John Houseman
 James Earl Jones
 Joe Mantell

 Hal Miller
 Jan Miner
 Michael Moriarty
 Christopher Plummer
 Mary Ellen Ray
 Lynn Redgrave

 Kate Reid
 Pernell Roberts
 Robert Ryan
 Charles Siebert
 Christopher Walken
 Fritz Weaver

Crest 

One of seven crests donated by the Timex corporation was stolen in March 2012. Each of the crests represented a different Shakespearean play. Timex has had a long affiliation with the theatre, starting with a donation of "the world's only properly calibrated sundial" in 1956.

ShakesBeer Festival 

In 2013, Beer Manager Steven Bilodeau of Wines Unlimited and Pete Rodrigues of Captain's Keg organized a beer festival on the grounds of the American Shakespeare Theatre called the ShakesBeer Festival in order to raise funds towards the restoration and reopening of the famed theatre.  The ShakesBeer Festival held on August 23, 2014, raised over $30,000 and donated $20,000 to the restoration efforts after final expenses.  This event was designed to be an annual event in order to bring in a source of revenue to the theatre and to raise awareness.

Festival! Stratford 

The 9th Festival! Stratford presented A Midsummer Night's Dream, performed by the Connecticut Free Shakespeare, on the grounds July 31 through August 1, 2013.

Fire 

On Sunday, January 13, 2019, the theatre burned to the ground from a massive fire. The structure was unoccupied at the time and had been vacant for thirty years. No fatalities or injuries occurred, and nothing was recovered from the building.

The cause of the fire remained unknown for several months. In April 2019, three local teenagers  Logan Caraballo, Vincent Keller, and Christopher Sakowicz  were charged as adults with arson, burglary, and other felonies, in connection with the theatre fire. The three teenagers were charged with starting five additional fires in the months following the theatre fire.

Although the trio originally pled not guilty in court, they publicly confessed after the theatre arson on Snapchat. Sakowicz and Keller later changed their pleas to guilty, with Sakowicz being found primarily responsible and receiving a ten-year prison sentence as well as 15 years special parole and mandatory psychiatric treatment. Keller potentially faces up to 18 months in prison, while Caraballo's case remains pending and sealed as of December 2022.

The Shakespeare Academy at Stratford said it plans to continue to stage outdoor performances at the property during the summer of 2019.

See also 

 Hamlet's Dresser, a 2002 memoir by Bob Smith about the author's experiences at the American Shakespeare Theatre

References

Sources

External links 
 Guide to American Shakespeare Theatre Plays and prompt books at Houghton Library, Harvard University

Theatre companies in Connecticut
Buildings and structures in Stratford, Connecticut
Defunct companies based in Connecticut
Entertainment companies established in 1955
1955 establishments in Connecticut
2019_disestablishments_in_Connecticut 
Entertainment_companies_disestablished_in_2019 
Demolished buildings and structures in Connecticut
Special Tony Award recipients